Belgorodsky Uyezd (Белгоро́дский уе́зд) was one of the subdivisions of the Kursk Governorate of the Russian Empire. It was situated in the southern part of the governorate. Its administrative centre was Belgorod.

Demographics
At the time of the Russian Empire Census of 1897, Belgorodsky Uyezd had a population of 174,299. Of these, 78.0% spoke Russian, 21.2% Ukrainian, 0.3% Polish, 0.3% Yiddish, 0.1% German and 0.1% Romani as their native language.

References

 
Uezds of Kursk Governorate
Kursk Governorate